In Tuned Out - Live '93 is a live album by alt-rock/goth metal band Shadow Project, released in early 1994 by Triple X Records.

Production 
During their 1993 tour in support for Dreams for the Dying'''s release, Shadow Project recorded a concert held in Fullerton, California on June 20, later to be released as In Tuned Out. Alongside tracks culled from their two studio albums, the record features an Alice Cooper medley, a David Bowie cover ("Panic in Detroit") and two unreleased songs. A Christian Death original, "Still Born/Still Life" -  dedicated to serial killer Jeffrey Dahmer - was also included in the set.

 Split 
Three months after this recording Shadow Project broke up. Eva O and Paris left the band to focus on the Eva O Halo Experience CD Demons Fall for an Angel's Kiss''. For his part, Williams declared that Shadow Project went as far it could. "Eva wanted to go in one direction and I in another", he justified; he then went on to pursue his own musical interests.

Track listing

Credits
Shadow Project
Rozz Williams – Vocals
Eva O – Guitar, Vocals
Paris – Keyboards & Samples
Mark Barone – Bass
Christian Omar Madrigal Izzo – Drums

Production
Mark Linett – Producer, Mixer
N. Keller House - Design, Front Cover Art

References

1994 live albums
Shadow Project albums
Live gothic metal albums
Triple X Records live albums